Alexander Susskind ben Moses of Grodno was a kabbalist of the eighteenth century. He died at Grodno in 1794. He wrote "Yesod we-Shoresh ha-'Abodah" (The Essence and Root of Worship), Novydvor, 1782, a work frequently republished. It contains directions for the right use and comprehension of the ritual, the daily Jewish prayers, and those for the Shabbat and Jewish holidays; also divers exegetical articles on Rashi's commentary on the Nevi'im and Ketuvim, and articles on the Holy Land and the Temple in Jerusalem. He also left an ethical will to his sons, which contains admonitions regarding divine service. This work was published in Grodno in 1794.

References 

18th-century writers from the Russian Empire
18th-century male writers
Hebrew-language writers
Jewish non-fiction writers
Kabbalists
Russian male writers
People from Grodno
Place of birth missing
Year of birth missing
1794 deaths